The Department of Justice and Attorney-General (DJAG) is a department of the Queensland Government with responsibilities for the administration of justice, support to Queensland courts, regulatory policy and consumer protection, legal aid, youth justice, corrective services, and other community and legal services.

The department is led by Director-General David Mackie and is responsible to the Attorney-General of Queensland and Minister for Justice the Hon. Shannon Fentiman , the first law officer of Queensland, and the Minister for Police and Minister for Corrective Services the Hon. Mark Ryan . All ministers are ultimately responsible to the Parliament of Queensland.

The department's headquarters are located in the State Law Building on Ann Street, Brisbane.

History
The origins of the Department of Justice and Attorney-General can be traced back to 1859 with the appointment of the first Attorney-General of Queensland in 1859 with the establishment of the Colony of Queensland.

19th century
In 1859, Queensland became a separate colony from New South Wales with Ratcliffe Pring QC appointed as first Attorney-General of Queensland and Robert Little appointed Queensland's first Crown Solicitor. The first sitting of the Queensland Legislative Assembly occurred in 1860. In 1863, Sir James Cockle was appointed as the first Chief Justice of Queensland. In 1866, the District Court of Queensland was established to ease the workload of the Supreme Court. In 1874, the Northern Supreme Court at Bowen was opened, the first to be built outside of Brisbane. In 1879, the Brisbane Supreme Court on George Street was opened. In 1886, the Justices Act 1886 was drafted and presented to parliament. In 1899, the Northern Supreme Court was moved from Bowen to Townsville.

20th century
In 1921, the Supreme Court Act 1921 was passed, resulting in the abolition of the District Court of Queensland. This was followed by in 1922 with the establishment of the Magistrates Court in the civil arena while the criminal jurisdiction was transferred to the Supreme Court.

The State Reporting Bureau was established in 1926 to provide court-reporting and hansard services.

In 1958, the District Court of Queensland was re-established by Parliament. In 1959, the Offenders Probation and Parole Act 1959 was introduced with provisions on juvenile justice. In 1970, the department developed the Consumer Affairs Bureau. In 1984, the Office of the Director of Public Prosecutions was created. The first Solicitor-General of Queensland was appointed under the Solicitor-General Act 1985.

In the early 1990s, the Attorney-General functions were separated from the justice portfolio. Justice retained the majority of its existing portfolio functions and inherited Corrective Services, creating the Department of Justice and Corrective Services. In 1992, the Departments of Justice and Attorney-General were re-joined and Arts policy was added to DJAG. Corrective Services went to its own portfolio and the fair trading and consumer
affairs components were separated to form the Department of Consumer Affairs.

21st century
The passage of the Guardianship and Administration Act 2000 led to the appointment of an Adult Guardian. In 2003, the Office of the State Coroner was created. In 2004, the Drug Courts and the Legal Services Commission were established. In 2007, the Office of Fair Trading, the Commercial and Consumer Tribunal, the Retail Shop Leases Registry, and the Office for Body Corporate and Community Management moved from the Department of Consumer Affairs to the Department of Justice and Attorney-General. In 2009, Victim Assist Queensland was established to support victims of violent crime and the Queensland Civil and Administrative Tribunal was established bringing together 23 separate civil, human rights and administrative tribunals.

In 2010, the Queensland Sentencing Advisory Council was established. In 2011, the Office of Liquor and Gaming Regulation joined DJAG. Under the Newman Government in 2012, Youth Justice joined DJAG from the Department of Communities the Sentencing Advisory Council was abolished. In 2013, the Queensland Corrective Services was transferred into DJAG. In 2014, the Office of the Public Guardian was established. In 2015, the trial specialist domestic and family violence court at Southport commenced. In 2015, the Office of the Director of Child Protection Litigation commenced and the Queensland Sentencing Advisory Council was re-established.

Following the 2017 Queensland state election and the machinery of government changes by the re-elected Palaszczuk Labor Government, the Youth Justice was moved to the newly established Department of Child Safety, Youth and Women and the Queensland Corrective Services becoming their own portfolio agency.

Role and responsibilities
The Department of Justice and Attorney-General is responsible for a range of legal, policy and judicial functions.

Organisational structure

Office of the Director-General
Crown Law
Internal Audit Branch 
Ethical Standards Unit 
Executive Services Branch

Justice Services 
Queensland Courts Service 
Supreme, District and Land Courts’ Service
 Magistrates Courts Service
 Reform and Support Services
Community Justice Services
 Dispute Resolution Branch
 Justice of the Peace Branch
 Registry of Births, Deaths and Marriages
 Victim Assist Queensland
 Office of the Commissioner for Body Corporate and Community Management
 Blue Card Services
Legal Assistance Strategy and Funding Unit
Queensland Civil and Administrative Tribunal

Liquor, Gaming and Fair Trading
Office of Fair Trading
Office of Liquor and Gaming Regulation
Office of Regulatory Policy

Strategic Policy and Legal Services
Legal Services Coordination Unit
Legal Advice and Advocacy
Right to Information and Privacy
Strategic Policy and Child Safety

Corporate Services
Financial Services Branch
Facilities Services
Information Technology Services
Human Resources Branch
Communication Services

Portfolio agencies
The following agencies are administered by the department:
Crime and Corruption Commission
Electoral Commission of Queensland
Queensland Ombudsman
Queensland Information Commissioner
Parole Board Queensland
Anti‐Discrimination Commission Queensland
Director of Public Prosecutions (Queensland)
Director of Child Protection Litigation
Legal Aid Queensland
Queensland Legal Services Commissioner
Public Advocate (Queensland)
Public Guardian (Queensland)
Queensland Prostitution Licensing Authority
Public Trustee (Queensland)
Queensland Law Reform Commission
Queensland Sentencing Advisory Council

References

External links
Department of Justice and Attorney-General official website

Government departments of Queensland
Queensland
1992 establishments in Australia